Krasulino is a rural locality (a village) in Chushevitskoye Rural Settlement, Verkhovazhsky District, Vologda Oblast, Russia. The population was 1 as of 2002.

Geography 
Krasulino is located 47 km southwest of Verkhovazhye (the district's administrative centre) by road. Rostovo is the nearest rural locality.

References 

Rural localities in Verkhovazhsky District